"Wild Heart" is a 1983 song by the American singer/songwriter Stevie Nicks. It was the third single from her second solo album, The Wild Heart. The song was written in 1981 and first performed during a Rolling Stone photo shoot with her to-be sister-in-law Lori Perry-Nicks. The original demo has the music of Fleetwood Mac's song "Can't Go Back".

Background
In an interview with Jim Ladd in 1983, Nicks said of the song, "The song the Wild Heart is kind of an abstract song, that was written in Long Island, New York. I mean at the same time that Enchanted was written. A long, long time ago, right at the same time that Bella Donna came out."

Album version
Nicks wrote the music of "Wild Heart" for the album version of the song which gave her full writing credits for the song. She made several changes to the lyrics of the song, such as an introduction dedicated to her then recently deceased friend, Robin Anderson. When Nicks played the song to her friend Tom Petty he said it was "epic" The song is over six minutes long.

Video
The video was recorded during a Rolling Stone photo shoot in 1981. It starts with Nicks singing a rendition of "Love in Store", a song by Fleetwood Mac's Christine McVie. The video ends with a version of McVie's "Wish You Were Here". The video has been viewed over a million times on YouTube. The backing music was written by Lindsey Buckingham found in a demo which can also be found on YouTube. It can also be found on the "Deluxe" 2016 reissue of Fleetwood Mac's Mirage album, as a track titled "Suma's Walk".

Personnel
Video personnel
Stevie Nicks – lead vocals
Lori Perry-Nicks – harmony vocals
Lindsey Buckingham – guitar, additional keyboards
Mick Fleetwood – drums, percussion
John McVie – bass guitar
Christine McVie – keyboards

Album version personnel
Stevie Nicks – lead vocals
Lori Perry-Nicks – harmony vocals
Sharon Celani – backing vocals
Sandy Stewart – synthesizer
David Munday – guitar
Roger Tausz – bass guitar
Brad Smith – drums, percussion
Dean Parks – guitar

References

Other sources
Timespace – The Best of Stevie Nicks, liner notes
Crystal Visions – The Very Best of Stevie Nicks, liner notes and commentary

Stevie Nicks songs
1983 songs
1983 singles
Songs written by Stevie Nicks
Song recordings produced by Jimmy Iovine
Modern Records (1980) singles